is a railway station in the village of Tsumagoi, Gunma, Japan, operated by the East Japan Railway Company (JR East).

Lines
Manza-Kazawaguchi Station is served by the Agatsuma Line and is located 52.3 rail kilometers from the terminus of the line at Shibukawa Station.

Station layout
The station consists of a single elevated side platform. The station is unattended.

History
The station opened on March 7, 1971. The station was absorbed into the JR East network upon the privatization of the Japanese National Railways (JNR) on 1 April 1987.

Passenger statistics
In fiscal 2015, the station was used by an average of 205 passengers daily (boarding passengers only).

Surrounding area
 
Manza Onsen

See also
List of railway stations in Japan

References

External links

Manza-Kazawaguchi Station information (JR East) 

Railway stations in Gunma Prefecture
Agatsuma Line
Stations of East Japan Railway Company
Railway stations in Japan opened in 1971
Tsumagoi, Gunma